Ribes magellanicum is a South American species of shrubs in the currant family, found in Patagonia (southern Chile and Argentina).

Two subspecies are accepted:
 Ribes magellanicum subsp. magellanicum
 Ribes magellanicum subsp. parviflorum Sparre

References

Plants described in 1812
Flora of Argentina
magellanicum
Flora of Chile
Berries